Trolak (Jawi: ترولق;) is a small estate town in Mukim Slim, Muallim District, Perak, Malaysia. It houses many FELDA explorers since circa 1960s with rubber plantation, later changed into oil palm plantation.

The name is said to be originated from a word called 'tarak lah' (lit:There's nothing) which was made from the progress of spelling and comprehension of the geographic officials in Perak.

Trolak is home to one of the MARA Junior Science College which first open it doors in 2008. Although the name of the school is MRSM FELDA, it is commonly known by the local as MRSM Trolak.

References

Muallim District
Towns in Perak